"Room Service" is a single by Canadian rock singer/songwriter and guitarist Bryan Adams, it was his third single from his ninth studio album Room Service, released in 2005.


Track listings

CD

Chart positions

References

2004 songs
2005 singles
Bryan Adams songs
Songs written by Bryan Adams
Songs written by Eliot Kennedy
Universal Music Group singles